Mangobo is a commune in western Kisangani, Democratic Republic of the Congo.  At the time of the Belgian Congo its name was Belge I (Belgian I).  It is located near the Congo and Tshopo rivers.

References 

Kisangani
Communes of the Democratic Republic of the Congo